Burzyn may refer to the following places in Poland:
 Burzyn, Lesser Poland Voivodeship, is a village in Lesser Poland Voivodeship, in southern Poland
 Burzyn, Podlaskie Voivodeship, a village in north-eastern Poland